Yi Gyun-yeong (1951-1996) was a South Korean writer.

Life
Yi Gyun-yeong was born in 1951 in Jeollanam-do. He graduated from Hanyang University and later worked as a Professor of Korean History at Dongduk Women's University. Yi won the Yi Sang Literature Prize, awarded by the Dong-A Ilbo, in 1984. His important works include a collection of stories titled The Faraway Light (1986) and the novel The Country of Lao-Tzu and Chuang-Tzu. In 1996 Yi died in a car crash at the age of 44. In English, his most famous work is The Other Side of Dark Remembrance, which was originally published in 1979 as a shorter story titled Division.

From 1986 until his early death, Yi was an editor of Historical Criticism published by Research Institute for Historical Problems. Yi primarily focused on the Korean independence movement.  His work on Singanhoe, an independence group, which culminated in Study of Singanhoe (Singanhoe yeongu, 1993), earned Yi the 8th Danjae Scholastic Award. Study of Singanhoe is considered to be the first research text that provides an unbiased view of Singanhoe.   In 1993, he published a full-length novel The Country of Laozi and Zhuangzi (Nojawa jangjaui nara).  Another novel The Leaves Make Lights of Longing (Namunipdeureun grieun bulbiteul mandeunda), appeared in the 1997 Spring issue of World Literature, after Yi's death.  Other works include the children's books, Scary Dance (Museo-un chum, 1986) and The Color of Winter Dream (Gyeoul kkumui saeksang, 1986) as well as a research work titled, Patriotic Enlightenment Movement During the Period of Daehanjeguk (Hanmal aeguk gyemong undong, 1991).

Yi Gyun-yeong's fiction has three distinctive aspects. First, his subjects and themes often focus on people who have been dispossessed and are wandering. Second the stories tend to have an autobiographical style - that is they are the life story of one man or a family. Finally, like many writers of the era, Yi Gyun-yeong's stories have a profound awareness of the painful history of Korea.

Work

Works in English
The Other Side of Dark Remembrance. .

Works in Korean (partial)
Academic
Study of Singanhoe (Singanhoe yeongu, 1993)
Patriotic Enlightenment Movement During the Period of Daehanjeguk (Hanmal aeguk gyemong undong, 1991)

Novels
The Country of Laozi and Zhuangzi (Nojawa jangjaui nara) (1995)
The Leaves Make Lights of Longing (Namunipdeureun grieun bulbiteul mandeunda) (1995)

Children's books
Scary Dance (Museo-un chum, 1986)
The Color of Winter Dream (Gyeoul kkumui saeksang, 1986)

Short story collections
The Faraway Light (1986)

References

External links
 Review of The Other Side of Dark Remembrance at KTLIT.

1951 births
1996 deaths
Hanyang University alumni
People from South Jeolla Province
South Korean novelists
20th-century novelists